Due to the topography of Cork City, and the lack of a single high point with citywide coverage, Cork City is home to a number of transmitters that cover the city.

Spur Hill
Spur Hill is home to the main RTÉ Radio transmitter for the city. It provides a relay of Mullaghanish of the Irish national radio stations to Cork City and parts of the Lee Valley. It has a single relay, at Collins Barracks. It previously carried RTÉ Radio Cork, an opt out from RTÉ Radio 1 on 89.2 MHz.

Collins Barracks
Collins Barracks is a relay of Spur Hill designed to provide coverage to blackspots in the city centre, and suburbs such as Blackpool and The Glen. Radio services were introduced in 2002, and Today FM was added in 2008. RTÉ 2FM was originally carried on 91.9 MHz, but moved to 92.0 to prevent issues caused by its original frequency being 10.7 MHz away from C103's Cork City relay on 102.6.

Hollyhill
Hollyhill, located on the northside of the City, is home to the original transmitter for Cork's 96FM, and later Cork's 103FM (now C103). It transmits both services to the city and surrounds, and has relays at Carrigaline, and Monatrea near Youghal.

C103 relay for Gearys 103.9
Cork's 96FM 96.8 MHz Geary's Relay
C103 relay Carslville Co Cork 102.9 low power 0.05KW

Churchfield
The Churchfield transmitter is located at the top of the 67m mast next to the Eircom building, near Knocknaheeny.

Other services

Buildings and structures in Cork (city)
Transmitter sites in Ireland